Brenninkmeijer is a Roman Catholic Dutch/German/Swiss family of manufacturers, which own an international chain of clothing stores.  Originally the family came from Tecklenburger Land (Westphalia), selling linen in Friesland in the Netherlands. In 1840 two members of the family founded C&A company in Sneek. Their descendants discovered the potential of the stock of produced ready-made garment. Today, the family owns the Cofra Holding AG, based in Switzerland which in turn controls the C&A fashion business, a private equity company, a real estate fund and two banks. The company focuses its efforts on real estate, sustainable energy and financial services.

History

19th century
From the end of the 18th century several Brenninkmeyers lived in Sneek, where Herman and his son Andreas founded a company. They were seasonal wandering merchants (peddlers), but forced by juridical restrictions to settle. Around 1835 they were assisted by their relatives Clemens and August from Mettingen (and surroundings). In 1841, Clemens and August founded a company (C&A) and stocked their goods in a warehouse, eliminating the need to travel. Around 1853 Clemens lived in Mettingen and August in Sneek, at a distance of 200 km to the NW. This small town in the north of the Netherlands became the location of their first shop in 1860; selling linen and cotton fabrics, sheets, bedding but also complete wedding suites. (Clothing manufacturers were the first sewing machine customers, and used them to produce the first ready-to-wear clothing.) In 1881 a branch was opened in Leeuwarden, and in 1893 and 1896 in Amsterdam; the possibility to buy on credit was abolished and the company started to sell menswear. In 1897, the family stopped to go peddling. Meanwhile more relatives arrived from Mettingen as apprentices. A carefully designed rulebook ‘Unitas’ ensured that Brenninkmeyer sons and daughters  enter the business in leadership positions at an early age, guaranteeing that the company was fully controlled by the family.

20th century

Bernard Joseph Brenninkmeijer (Mettingen 1871 - Rome 1945), the youngest son of Clemens, is considered to be the father of the C&A formula. He started discounting in Amsterdam (Rekenen in Centen, in plaats van Procenten). In 1906 he repositioned the company which was the first step towards future years of exceptional successes. In his store in Amsterdam, he was one of the world's first discounters, introducing fixed prices. Instead of using a customary "keystone" gross margin of 50% he only asked for 25% or less. His insight: "you could cut your profit mark-up dramatically. Even with much a lower margin, the far greater volume of sales would still boost the bottom line profit. This major innovation has had a great impact on people's thinking within all C&A companies even to this very day."

By 1910 there were ten stores in the Netherlands, also in Groningen and Rotterdam. In 1911, the company opened the first German store in Berlin, managed by Clemens (1862-1938).  In 1922, the company started a store in Oxford Street. During WWII the company profited from (expropriated) Jewish real estate and Ostarbeiter; after the war from the economic boom. The first store in the USA was opened in 1948. In 1967 C&A cooperated with Twiggy as designer; shops were opened in Belgium. In the 1970s the expansion of C&A went on: also Switzerland, France, Spain and Japan were added as markets. In 1981, Yves Saint Laurent and Karl Lagerfeld worked for C&A. In the 1990s the company opened shops in Portugal and Mexico.

According to NRC Handelsblad, the family also financed the establishment of the CDA and the Pope's arrival in the Netherlands in 1985. The Brenninkmeijers have meanwhile donated more than a billion euros to the Catholic church. Since 1995, the Brenninkmeijers' philanthropic activities have been managed more centrally via Porticus and Benevolentia. Until the mid-nineties only male descendants in a direct line of Clemens and August Brenninkmeijer could become shareholders.

21st century

C&A is an apparel company with headquarters in Vilvoorde and Düsseldorf. In 2017 it operated approximately 1,575 stores in 18 European countries. These companies are linked through the COFRA group, based in Zug, a tax haven in Switzerland. The company closed its stores in the United Kingdom and Denmark in 2000. In the 21st century many new stores have been opened in Eastern Europe countries. The company has also opened stores in China (2007).  C&A-Online launched in Germany in 2008. Across their businesses, the Brenninkmeyers employ more than 35,000 people worldwide.

For a period of time Eastern Mountain Sports, Steinbach, Ohrbach's, Maurices, Miller's Outpost and others were owned through the American Retail Group. In the 1980s and 1990s, they owned the Comark group in Canada, which included Bretton's department stores, Clark Shoes and Collacut luggage stores. The Canadian operations were sold in 2005 to KarpReilly, LLC of Greenwich, Connecticut.

In 2009, the Brenninkmeijer family founded the Draiflessen Collection in Mettingen. In 2016 Kai Bosecker published his "Family Businesses as a Phenomenon: Insights" that the family had commissioned into the role of C&A during the Nazi regime. Mark Spoerer published "C&A. Ein Familienunternehmen in Deutschland, den Niederlanden und Großbritannien 1911–1961". The Brenninkmeijers, practise philanthropy (10% of the profit) through at least 58 foundations around the world. C&A Brazil went public.

In 2011, Jean-Louis Brenninkmeijer founded Little Canada. A Toronto-based organization constructing a miniature model of Canada.

In 2015, Bregal Partners, an arm of Cofra Holding, began investing in the fishing industry of the United States. The firm owns stake in Seattle-based American Seafoods and Blue Harvest Fisheries in New Bedford, Massachusetts. Blue Harvest Fisheries is the single largest groundfish permit holder in New England.

In 2017, Alain Caparros succeeded Philippe Brenninkmeijer as CEO of C&A Europe; he was the first non-family member at the helm of the company. In 2019 the CEO Post for C&A Europe was held by Edward Brenninkmeijer; in 2021 by Giny Boer, the first woman at the top. Meanwhile C&A sold its Mexico and China business to local investors.

Fortune
In addition to textile retailer C&A, the Brenninkmeijers own and control several companies in the private equity, real estate and financial services industries. named Anthos Fund & Asset Management, Redevco, and Bregal. Through their investment vehicles, they have stake in two of the largest fishing companies on each coast of the United States.

Notable members
The family seems to have 12 branches and 500 members. Albert Brenninkmeijer (born 1974), married Princess Carolina of Bourbon-Parma, a cousin of King Willem-Alexander of the Netherlands, on 21 April 2012 in Wijk bij Duurstede.

From 1988 to 2011, Mother Theresa Brenninkmeyer was the prioress, later abbess, of a convent in Sostrup Castle (Denmark).

Two family members have entered the entertainment industry, producer Stephan Brenninkmeijer and actor Philippe Brenninkmeyer.

References

External links
 COFRA Holding website
 https://mtsprout.nl/management-leiderschap/bonje-bij-de-brenninkmeijers-waarover
 https://www.dedikkeblauwe.nl/news/stilte-over-private-filantropie-brenninkmeijers-bijbels-gemotiveerd
 https://decorrespondent.nl/11375/veel-voor-weinig-hoe-c-a-als-eerste-fast-fashion-naar-nederland-bracht/4582620292250-16e8894a

Dutch families
German families
Roman Catholic families